Begonia  is a genus of perennial flowering plants in the family Begoniaceae. The genus contains more than 2,000 different plant species. The Begonias are native to moist subtropical and tropical climates. Some species are commonly grown indoors as ornamental houseplants in cooler climates. In cooler climates some species are cultivated outside in summertime for their bright colorful flowers, which have sepals but no petals.

Description
With 2,002 species, Begonia is one of the largest genera of flowering plants. The species are terrestrial (sometimes epiphytic) herbs or undershrubs, and occur in subtropical and tropical moist climates, in South and Central America, Africa, and southern Asia. Terrestrial species in the wild are commonly upright-stemmed, rhizomatous, or tuberous.  The plants are monoecious, with unisexual male and female flowers occurring separately on the same plant; the male contains numerous stamens, and the female has a large inferior ovary and two to four branched or twisted stigmas. In most species, the fruit is a winged capsule containing numerous minute seeds, although baccate fruits are also known. The leaves, which are often large and variously marked or variegated, are usually asymmetric (unequal-sided).

Taxonomy 
The genus name Begonia was coined by Charles Plumier, a French patron of botany, and adopted by Linnaeus in 1753, to honor Michel Bégon, a former governor of the French colony of Saint-Domingue (now Haiti).

Phylogeny 
The following phylogenetic tree shows the relationships among  sections of the genus Begonia.

Species

Selected species:

 Begonia coccinea
 Begonia cucullata
 Begonia foliosa
 Begonia grandis Dryand.
 Begonia obliqua

Cultivation 

The different groups of begonias have different cultural requirements, but most species come from tropical regions, so they and their hybrids require warm temperatures. Most are forest understory plants and require bright shade; few will tolerate full sun, especially in warmer climates. In general, begonias require a well-drained growing medium that is neither constantly wet nor allowed to dry out completely. Many begonias will grow and flower year-round except for tuberous begonias, which usually have a dormant period. During this dormant period, the tubers can be stored in a cool, dry place. Begonias of the semperflorens group (or wax begonias) are frequently grown as bedding plants outdoors. Wax begonias are very attractive, they adapt well when brought inside the house for overwintering and can live up to 4-5 years.

A recent group of hybrids derived from this group is marketed as "Dragonwing" begonias; they are much larger both in leaf and in flower. Tuberous begonias are frequently used as container plants. Although most Begonia species are tropical or subtropical in origin, the Chinese species B. grandis is hardy to USDA hardiness zone 6 and is commonly known as the "hardy begonia". Most begonias can be grown outdoors year-round in subtropical or tropical climates, but in temperate climates, begonias are grown outdoors as annuals, or as house or greenhouse plants.

Most begonias are easily propagated by division or from stem cuttings. In addition, some can be propagated from leaf cuttings or even sections of leaves, particularly the members of the rhizomatous and rex groups.

Horticultural nomenclature 

The nomenclature of begonias can be very complex and confusing. The term 'picotee' refers to edging on the petals that is in contrast to the color of the main petal if the colors blend. If they do not, then the term 'marginata' is used, but sometimes these terms are used simultaneously. 'Non-Stop' refers to a camellia tuberous hybrid that under certain conditions will bloom 'non-stop' all year round.

Cultivar groups 

Because of their sometimes showy flowers of white, pink, scarlet, or yellow color and often attractively marked leaves, many species and innumerable hybrids and cultivars are cultivated. The genus is unusual in that species throughout the genus, even those coming from different continents, can frequently be hybridized with each other, and this has led to an enormous number of cultivars. The American Begonia Society classifies begonias into several major groups:

Cane begonia  forms tough, bamboo-like canes
 shrub-like
 tuberous
 rhizomatous
 semperflorens (wax or fibrous rooted begonias)
 Rex
 trailing-scandent
 thick-stemmed
For the most part, these groups do not correspond to any formal taxonomic groupings or phylogeny, and many species and hybrids have characteristics of more than one group or do not fit well in any of them.

AGM plants
The following is a selection from about 70 species, varieties and cultivars which currently hold the Royal Horticultural Society's Award of Garden Merit: 
 
 Begonia 'Benitochiba' 
 Begonia dregei 
 Begonia foliosa var. miniata
 Begonia 'Glowing Embers' 
 Begonia grandis subsp. evansiana 
 Begonia grandis subsp. evansiana var. alba 
 Begonia 'Green Gold' 
 Begonia listada 
 Begonia luxurians 
 Begonia masoniana 
 Begonia metallica 
 Begonia solananthera 
 Begonia soli-mutata 
 Begonia sutherlandii

Culture
The cultivar 'Kimjongilia' is a floral emblem of North Korea.

Most begonias are sour to the taste, and some people in some areas eat them. This is safe in small amounts but potentially toxic in large quantities due to the prevalence of oxalic acid in the tissues.

References

Journal articles

External links

 
 American Begonia Society
 W. S. Hoover et al. 2004, Notes on the geography of South-East Asian Begonia and species diversity in montane forests
 Phylogenetic Relationships of the Afro-Malagasy Members of the Large Genus Begonia Inferred from trnL Intron Sequences
 A Phylogeny of Begonia Using Nuclear Ribosomal Sequence Data and Morphological Characters
Begonia L. Plants of the World Online
Accepted species Plants of the World Online

 
Cucurbitales genera
Garden plants